Żurawski (feminine Żurawska, plural Żurawscy) is a Polish locational surname, which originally meant a person from places in Poland called Żuraw, Żurawka or Żurawice, derived from the Polish word żuraw, meaning "crane". Variants of the name include Żorawski, and Żurawsky. The name may refer to:

 Andrzej Żurawski, Polish ice hockey player
 Artur Żurawski (born 1972), Polish cinematographer
 Chris Zurawsky (born 1962), American politician
 Maciej Żurawski (born 1976), Polish footballer
 Maciej Żurawski (footballer, born 2000), Polish footballer
 Martin Zurawsky (born 1990), German footballer
 Vitaly Zhuravsky (born 1955), Ukrainian politician
 Zdzisław Żurawski (born 1954), Polish military officer

 Kazimierz Żórawski (born 1866), Polish mathematician
 Dmitrii Ivanovich Zhuravskii, also known as D.I. Jourawski (born 1821), Russian engineer

See also
Pustków Żurawski, a village in Poland

References

Polish-language surnames
Toponymic surnames